Aurimas Kieža (born 25 October 1982) is a Lithuanian professional basketball player for BC Sūduva.

Professional career
On 14 April 2011 Kieža was named the Lithuanian Basketball League's regular season MVP, after averaging 15.7 points, 10.5 rebounds, 2.6 assists, and 1.3 blocks (with an efficiency rating of 22.0) per game.

References

External links 
 Eurobasket.com Profile 
 FIBA.com Profile

1982 births
Living people
BC Pieno žvaigždės players
Hofstra Pride men's basketball players
KB Prishtina players
Lithuanian men's basketball players
Pallacanestro Reggiana players
Basketball players from Kaunas
Power forwards (basketball)